The L family is a family of inline four-cylinder diesel engines manufactured by Toyota, which first appeared in October 1977. It is the first diesel engine from Toyota to use a rubber timing belt in conjunction with a SOHC head. Some engines like the 2L-II and the 2L-T are still in production to the present day. , the 5L-E engine is still used in Gibraltar in the fifth-generation Toyota HiAce, eighth-generation Toyota Hilux, second-generation Toyota Fortuner, and fourth-generation Toyota Land Cruiser Prado. Vehicles with the diesel engine were exclusive to Toyota Japan dealership locations called Toyota Diesel Store until that sales channel was disbanded in 1988.

L 

The L is the first L engine produced. Toyota solely refers to it as the L engine, not the 1L engine. , four-cylinder diesel engine.

Applications:

 at 4200 rpm,  at 2400 rpm (Gross JIS)

6th generation Crown Sedan/Hardtop/Wagon/Van (LS110) with manual transmission
2nd generation HiAce Truck/Van/Wagon (LH11/20/24/30) and 1st generation Hiace Quick Delivery (LH24HV)
4th generation Toyoace (LY20/30)
3rd generation Hiace Van/Wagon (LH50/60/70)
3rd generation Hilux (LN40)
4th generation Hilux (LN55)
1st generation Blizzard (LD10)
1979−1980 Mark II (LX40)
1980−1984 Mark II Sedan/Cressida/Chaser/Cresta (LX60/LX67V)

2L 

The 2L is a  4-cylinder diesel engine.

Applications:

 at 4200 rpm,  at 2400 rpm (JIS Gross)
7th generation Crown Sedan/Crown Van (LS120/126V) with Manual transmission
3rd generation Hiace (LH51/51G/51V/56/61/66/71/76)
4th generation Hilux (LN56) and 1st Generation Hilux Surf/4Runner (LN60/65)
1985-1988 5th generation Toyoace/Dyna 100/Dyna 150 (LY50/60), 3rd Generation Hiace Truck (LH80/85/90/95), and 2nd generation Hiace Quick Delivery (LH80VH/85)

 at 4000 rpm,  at 2400 rpm (Net)
1984−1990 2nd Generation Blizzard (LD20)

 at 4000 rpm,  at 2400 rpm (Net JIS)
8th generation Crown Sedan (LS136V)

 at 4000 rpm,  at 2400 rpm (Net JIS)
8th generation Crown Sedan (LS130)

 at 4200 rpm,  at 2400 rpm (Gross JIS)
Mark II/Chaser/Cresta/Cressida (LX70)

2L-II

The 2L-II is an upgrade of the 2L introduced simultaneously with the 3L engine in 1988 in the 5th generation Hilux. Although bore and stroke remain the same, multiple changes have been made in its design. The engine block was made more rigid through the use of finite element analysis and through adding reinforcement ribbing. The most significant change is the redesigned cylinder head, where the camshaft now lifts the valve directly via tappet instead of using a rocker arm. The exhaust valve is 1mm larger in diameter and the inlet manifold is made 10mm larger in diameter. The pistons with a 5mm shorter compression height and piston rings were placed closer to the combustion chamber to reduce wasted volumetric capacity while durability was improved by the adoption of fiber reinforced piston grooves from the 1st Generation 2LTE to improve piston ring seizure resistance, groove wear resistance, thermal conductivity   and thermal fatigue resistance over the previous Ni-Resist cast iron insert used previously to address ring seizure issues and wear resistance in bare aluminum pistons while the oil squirters were relocated to spray underneath the hottest part of the piston to further aid cooling. The revised pistons were 100g lighter than the ones in the 1st Generation 2L and the compression ratio changed to 22.2. The valve clearance is adjusted using shims. Later L engines (3L and 5L) also use this method of valve operation.

Applications:
Crown Comfort (LSX10)
9th generation Crown Sedan (LS130)

 at 4200 rpm,  at 2400 rpm (Net JIS)
Mark II/Chaser/Cresta (LX80)
1988−onwards 5th generation Toyoace/Dyna 100 (LY50/60)

 at 4200 rpm,  at 2400 rpm (Net JIS)

 at 4200 rpm,  at 2400 rpm (Thailand, EEC)

 at 4200 rpm,  at 2400 rpm (UK) 1989-1995

 at 4200 rpm,  at 2200 rpm (UK) 1995 onwards
5th generation Hilux

 at 4200 rpm,  at 2400 rpm (South Africa, SABS)

 at 4200 rpm,  at 2400 rpm (Philippines)

 at 4000 rpm,  at 2400 rpm (Thailand, EEC)

 at 4000 rpm,  at 2200 rpm (UK) 1997-2000

 at 4000 rpm,  at 2200 rpm (UK) 2000 onwards
6th Generation Hilux

 at 4000 rpm,  at 2200-2800 rpm (UK, ECE) 1996-2000

 at 4000 rpm,  at 2200 rpm (UK)2000 onwards
4th generation Hiace Powervan/Hiace SBV (LXH10/LXH20)

 at 4200 rpm,  at 2400 rpm (Net JIS)

 at 3900 rpm,  at 2400 rpm (UK) 
4th generation Hiace (LH100/100G/102/104/108/110/112/114/118/140G)

 at 4200 rpm,  at 2400 rpm (Indian Market)
3rd generation Kijang (Venture/Stallion/Qualis - LF50)

 at 4200 rpm,  at 2400 rpm (Malaysia)

 at 4200 rpm,  at 2400 rpm (Indonesia)
4th generation Kijang (Kijang/Tamaraw FX Revo/Unser - LF60/70/72/80/82)

 at 4200 rpm,  at 2500 rpm (Philippines)

2L-T

The 2L-T is a  turbo version of the 2L still being produced since 1982. The bore and stroke are the same but the 2L-T has a compression ratio of 20:1. Output is  gross at 4000 rpm with  gross of torque at 2200 rpm. A dual mass flywheel was introduced in 1985 and pilot fuel injection in 1988.

Applications:

 at 4000 rpm,  at 2400 rpm (Gross JIS)
1982−1983, 6th generation Crown Hardtop/Crown Sedan (LS111) with manual transmission
1983−1984, 7th generation Crown Hardtop/Crown Sedan/Crown Wagon (LS120/120G) with manual transmission
3rd generation Hiace (LH51G)
Mark II Sedan/Chaser Sedan (LX60)
Mark II Sedan/Chaser Sedan/Cresta (LX70)
94 PS (69 kW; 93 hp) at 4000 rpm, 216 N⋅m (159 lb⋅ft) at 2,400 rpm (USA)
1984-1985 Toyota Pickup

 at 4000 rpm,  at 2400 rpm (Net JIS)
1st generation Hilux Surf/4Runner
Land Cruiser (70 Series) Light Duty/Bundera 
8th generation Crown Sedan/Crown Hardtop (LS130) with manual transmission

 at 4000 rpm, 20.0:1

 at 4000 rpm,  at 2400 rpm (Gross JIS)
1985−1990 2nd Generation Blizzard (LD20)

2L-T(II)

The 2L-T(II) is an upgrade of the 2L-T. Of the same dimensions as all other 2L engines, the most significant change is that the camshaft lifts the valve directly via tappet instead of a rocker arm. The valve clearance is adjusted using shims. Compression rate varies with fitment.

Applications:

Compression Ratio 20.0:1
 at 3500 rpm,  at 2200 rpm (UK)1997-2000
6th Generation Hilux

Compression Ratio 21.0:1

 at 4000 rpm,  at 2400 rpm (Net JIS)
1989-1990, 4th generation Hiace (LH100G)
2nd generation Hilux Surf (LN130G)
Mark II/Chaser/Cresta (LX80)

 at 4000rpm,  at 2200rpm (UK)2000 onwards
6th Generation Hilux

Compression Ratio 22.2:1
 at 3500rpm,  at 2250rpm (UK, DIN)
 2000–2006 Metrocab TTT

2L-TE

Developed as a new version of 2L-T in 1982, the 2L-TE featured a new development used in diesel engines at that time, an electronically controlled injection pump. Although electronic fuel injection systems had long been used in gasoline engines, this is among the first diesel engine to adopt such a system. The electronic system (called "EFI" by Toyota) meters fuel with great precision and increased the engine's efficiency. It works through a combination of multiple sensors similar to those in a gasoline engine, but rather than actuating a fuel injector it actuates an SPV (Spill Control Valve) which is located on the head of the injection pump. To improve durability a new piston design using alumina-silica ceramic fiber reinforced piston ring grooves was used in place of the usual cast iron insert. This makes it one of the earliest applications of metal matrix composites. Like the 2L-T, it is a turbocharged  SOHC (single overhead cam) engine with 8 valves. Due to the EFI system, the 2L-TE develops significantly more torque than its predecessor. The redline of this engine is at 4800 rpm, the compression ratio is 20.0:1. The 2L-TE was largely replaced by the KZ engine in 1993, although it continued to be used in some models until 2000.

Applications:

 at 4000rpm,  at 2400rpm (Gross JIS)
1982−1983, 6th generation Crown Hardtop/Crown Sedan (LS111) with automatic transmission
1983−1984, 7th generation Crown Hardtop/Crown Sedan/Crown Wagon (LS120/120G) with automatic transmission

2L-TE(II) 
The 2L-TE(II) is an upgrade of the 2L-TE. Of the same dimensions as the 2L-TE engine, the most significant change is that the camshaft lifts the valve directly via tappet instead of a rocker arm. The valve clearance is adjusted using shims (the earlier heads were prone to cracking under high temperatures because of a cooling chamber that runs between the intake and exhaust valves and allows for steam build up at high temperature - part number 11101-54120, that was fixed in the later 2nd gen heads - part number 11101-54121). Compression ratio is also increased to 21.0:1, slightly higher than the 2L-T and 2L-TE.

Applications

 at 3800 rpm,  at 2400 rpm (Net JIS)
1993−1995, 9th generation Crown Sedan/Crown Wagon (LS130/130W/131H) and Crown Hardtop (LS141)
10th generation Crown Sedan/Crown Hardtop (LS151/151H)
Comfort (LSX11)
Mark II/Chaser/Cresta (LX90/LX100)

 at 3800 rpm,  at 2400 rpm (Net JIS)
6th generation Hilux
2nd generation Hilux Surf (LN130G/LN130W)
1st generation Land Cruiser Prado (LJ70)
1990-1993, 4th generation Hiace (LH120G)

2L-THE
Introduced in 1984, the High Pressure turbocharged version of 2L-TE features ceramic chambers. In this engine, the fuel is injected with a high pressure system. Bore and stroke remains the same,  for both however compression is increased to 21:1. The engine comes with a Turbo charger and used the EFI (Electronic Fuel Injection) system as well. Ignition feedback control would be added in 1985.

Applications:

 at 4000 rpm,  at 2400 rpm (Gross, Japan)

 at 4000 rpm,  at 2400 rpm (Net, Japan)
1984−1985, 7th generation Crown Hardtop/Crown Sedan/Crown Wagon (LS120/120G) 
8th generation Crown Hardtop/Crown Sedan/Crown Wagon (LS130/130G) with automatic transmission

2L-THE(II)
Has the same dimensions and is still referred to as the 2L-THE engine, the most significant change is that the camshaft lifts the valve directly via tappet instead of a rocker arm. The valve clearance is adjusted using shims.

Applications:
 at 3800 rpm,  at 2400 rpm (Net JIS)
1991−1993, 9th generation Crown Sedan/Crown Wagon (LS130/130W/131H) and Crown Hardtop (LS141)

3L 

The 3L is a  four-cylinder diesel engine.

Applications:

Land Cruiser Prado (LJ95)

 at 4000 rpm,  at 2400 rpm (Net JIS)
2nd Generation Hilux Surf/4Runner (LN131V)
4th generation Hiace (LH107/103/105/109/113/115/117/119/123/125/129/)
1995−1999, 2nd generation Quick Delivery 100(LH81VH/LY151)[better source needed]
1988-onwards 5th generation Toyoace/Dyna 150 (LY50/60)
7th generation Toyoace/Dyna (4th generation Hiace Truck - LY101/111/151/161)

 at 4000 rpm,  at 2400 rpm (Net JIS)

 at 3800 rpm,  at 2400 rpm (Thailand, EEC)
5th generation Hilux

 at 4000 rpm,  at 2400 rpm (Philippines)/(Malaysia, SAE Net)/(UN Spec)
6th generation Hilux

5L 

The 5L is a  four-cylinder diesel engine.

Applications:

 Crown Comfort (LSX12)

 at 4000 rpm,  at 2400 rpm (Net JIS)
1999−2001, 2nd generation Quick Delivery 100(LH82K/LY152)
2001−2004, 3rd generation Urban Transporter (LY228K/LY270)
7th generation Toyoace/Dyna

 at 4000 rpm,  at 2400 rpm (Net JIS)

 at 4000 rpm,  at 2400 rpm (Australia, DIN)

 at 4000 rpm,  at 2400 rpm (Thailand, EEC Net)  1998-1999 model
6th generation Hilux

 at 4000 rpm,  at 2400 rpm (Australia)

 at 4000 rpm,  at 2400 rpm (Philippines) 
4th generation Hiace (LH154/162/164/166/168/172/174/176/182/184/186/188)  

 at 4000 rpm,  at 2400 rpm

 4th generation Kijang (Toyota Condor/Condor Panel Van - LF61/81/85)  

 at 4000 rpm,  at 2400–2800 rpm 
Dyna 150 (LY235)

5L-E 

The 5L-E is a  EFI version of the 5L engine. It is the latest member of the L family. Output (as fitted to the Hilux) is  gross at 4200 rpm with  gross of torque at 2200 rpm. Power output varies according to fitment. The engine number is found on the top face of the block at the front of the engine.

Applications:

 at 4200 rpm,  at 2400 rpm (SABS)

 at 4000 rpm,  at 2600 rpm (Thailand, EEC Net)  Gross 2000-2001 model

 at 4000 rpm,  at 2600 rpm (Thailand, EEC Net)  Gross 2001-on model 
6th generation Hilux

 at 4000 rpm,  at 2400 rpm  (UN Spec) 
3rd generation Land Cruiser Prado (LJ120)

 at 4000 rpm,  at 2200 rpm (UN Spec)
1st and 2nd generation Fortuner (LAN50L/155L)
4th generation Land Cruiser Prado (LJ150)
5th generation Hiace (LH202)
7th and 8th generation Hilux (LAN25/125L)

See also
 List of Toyota engines

References

L
Diesel engines by model
Straight-four engines